The 2002 Harvard Crimson football team was an American football team that represented Harvard University during the 2002 NCAA Division I-AA football season. The Crimson finished second in the Ivy League.

In their ninth year under head coach Timothy Murphy, the Crimson compiled a 7–3 record and outscored opponents 267 to 230. Neil Rose was the team captain.

Harvard's 6–1 conference record placed second in the Ivy League standings. The Crimson outscored Ivy opponents 190 to 154. 

The Crimson appeared briefly, twice, in the national Division I-AA rankings: they were ranked No. 23 in the preseason poll, but dropped out of the top 25 before playing a game; and after opening the year with two wins, they were ranked No. 25 in the first poll of October. After their record dropped to 2–1, they again fell out of the national rankings, and did not reappear in 2002.

On November 16, the annual Harvard–Penn game was the first Division I-AA matchup to host an episode of ESPN's "College GameDay", which had only visited Division I-A sites in its first nine years of remote broadcasts. The Ivy League had called ESPN to suggest highlighting the matchup of two teams with 5–0 conference records.

Harvard played its home games at Harvard Stadium in the Allston neighborhood of Boston, Massachusetts.

Schedule

References

Harvard
Harvard Crimson football seasons
Harvard Crimson football
Harvard Crimson football